John Mostyn may refer to:
 John Mostyn (MP for Flintshire) (died 1644), Welsh politician
 John Mostyn (British Army officer) (1710–1779), British governor of Minorca, 1768–1778
 John Mostyn (music manager), English music manager
 John Harold Mostyn (1887–1956), Lord Mayor of Sydney and rugby league administrator